Communauté d'agglomération Grand Châtellerault is the communauté d'agglomération, an intercommunal structure, centred on the town of Étampes. It is located in the Essonne department, in the Île-de-France region, northern France. Created in 2008, its seat is in Étampes. Its area is 482.5 km2. Its population was 54,673 in 2019, of which 25,629 in Étampes proper.

Composition
The communauté d'agglomération consists of the following 37 communes:

Abbéville-la-Rivière
Angerville
Arrancourt
Authon-la-Plaine
Blandy
Bois-Herpin
Boissy-la-Rivière
Boissy-le-Sec
Boutervilliers
Bouville
Brières-les-Scellés
Brouy
Chalo-Saint-Mars
Chalou-Moulineux
Champmotteux
Chatignonville
Congerville-Thionville
Étampes
Fontaine-la-Rivière
La Forêt-Sainte-Croix
Guillerval
Marolles-en-Beauce
Le Mérévillois
Mérobert
Mespuits
Monnerville
Morigny-Champigny
Ormoy-la-Rivière
Plessis-Saint-Benoist
Puiselet-le-Marais
Pussay
Roinvilliers
Saclas
Saint-Cyr-la-Rivière
Saint-Escobille
Saint-Hilaire
Valpuiseaux

References

Etampois Sud Essonne
Etampois Sud Essonne